Ormocarpopsis aspera is a species of flowering plant in the family Fabaceae. It is found only in Madagascar.

References

aspera
Endemic flora of Madagascar
Near threatened plants
Taxonomy articles created by Polbot